"Creator ineffabilis" (Latin for "O Creator Ineffable") is a Christian prayer composed by the 13th century Doctor of the Church St. Thomas Aquinas. It is also called the "Prayer of the St. Thomas Aquinas Before Study" because St. Thomas "would often recite this prayer before he began his studies, writing, or preaching." Pope Pius XI published this prayer in his 1923 encyclical letter on St. Thomas Aquinas, Studiórum Ducem. It is now among the most well-known prayers attributed to Saint Thomas Aquinas.

Text of the prayer

References

External links
Gregorian chant setting of Creátor Ineffábilis

Works by Thomas Aquinas
Prayer